Mexsana is an antiseptic medicated powder. It is used to relieve itching and chafing, to protect against perspiration odor and discomfort, while also keeping the skin's pH balanced. The product is also used to treat severely chapped skin, minor burns, and other minor skin irritations. Currently Mexsana medicated powder is produced by Merck Sharp & Dohme (MSD) Laboratories.

Not to be confused with "Mexana" medicated powder, sold in the Dominican Republic.

Active Ingredients: Zinc oxide, kaolin, benzethonium chloride.

Also contains: Camphor, eucalyptus oil, fragrance, lemon oil.

Process
The product's elaboration process stands out for the strictness in its safety measures and also in the precise measures for weighting its components. The powder, mineral of less hardness in the Mohs scale, is the source that gives the name to the generic product used for personal hygienic purposes, and forms around 85% of the composition of the brand.

Initially, packages filled with huge amounts of this material, arranged in sacks of 25 kilograms each, are placed in warehouses that technically isolate the daily contamination, due to a sophisticated air flow mechanism.

In popular culture
A can of Mexsana brand heat powder can be found on the back of the Greatest Hits album of Mötley Crüe.

Products available in Colombia
Currently the brand has both powder and spray products available in the Colombian market (Made by Bayer Andina):

Powder
 Talcos Mexsana 
 Lady Mexsana
 Mexsana Avena

Sprays
 Mexsana Pies
 Lady Mexsana Antibacterial
 Mexsana Pies Antiperspirant
 Mexsana Pies Ultra
 Mexsana Pies Avena

Antiseptics